Leiosalpingidae is a family of bryozoans belonging to the order Cheilostomatida.

Genera:
 Astoleiosalpinx d'Hondt & Gordon, 1996 
 Leiosalpinx Hayward & Cook, 1979

References

Bryozoan families